Gerasimus I may refer to:

 Gerasimus I of Constantinople, Ecumenical Patriarch in 1320–1321
 Patriarch Gerasimus I of Alexandria, ruled in 1620–1636